Nicole Melichar and Květa Peschke were the defending champions but chose to compete with different partners. Melichar partnered Xu Yifan, but lost in the quarterfinals to Ashleigh Barty and Kiki Bertens. Peschke partnered Demi Schuurs, but lost in the first round to Darija Jurak and Alicja Rosolska.

Hsieh Su-wei and Barbora Strýcová won the title, defeating Barty and Bertens in the final, 3–6, 7–6(9–7), [10–8].

Seeds

Draw

Draw

References

External Links
Main Draw

Brisbane International - Doubles
Doubles